The 2021–22 Iowa State Cyclones men's basketball team represents Iowa State University during the 2021–22 NCAA Division I men's basketball season. The Cyclones are coached by T. J. Otzelberger, who is in his first season as head coach, and ninth season at Iowa State.  They play their home games at Hilton Coliseum in Ames, Iowa as members of the Big 12 Conference.

The Cyclones started the season 12–0, good for one of the best starts in school history, including being crowned the champion of the NIT Season Tip-Off with wins over 25th-ranked Xavier and 9th-ranked Memphis. In Otzelberger's first season as head coach he claimed the best start to an Iowa State coaching career by winning his first 10 games, ultimately winning his first 12 games before losing at home to #1 Baylor to end his unbeaten start at Iowa State.

Previous season
In a season limited due to the ongoing COVID-19 pandemic, the Cyclones finished the 2020–21 season 2–22, 0–18 in Big 12 play to finish in last place. They lost to Oklahoma in the first round of the Big 12 Conference tournament. 

Following the winless conference season, the school fired head coach Steve Prohm after six years in Ames. On March 18, 2021, it was announced that the school had hired UNLV head coach and former Iowa State assistant Otzelberger as the team's new head coach.

Offseason

Departures

Incoming transfers

2021 recruiting class

Roster

}

Schedule and results
This is the second season that Big 12 Now on ESPN+ will air a number of Big 12 games. On May 20, 2021, Iowa State announced it would play in the 2021 NIT Season Tip-Off on November 24 and November 26.  The tournament also featured Memphis, Virginia Tech, and Xavier. On June 2, the Big 12 announced matchups as part of the Big East-Big 12 Battle, with Iowa State traveling to Omaha, Nebraska to play Creighton and former Iowa State head coach Greg McDermott. The game will be played on December 4. Iowa will then travel to Ames as part of the Iowa Corn Cy-Hawk Series on December 9.  On June 23, it was announced that the Cyclones will face Missouri in the Big 12/SEC Challenge.  On June 30, Iowa State announced its nonconference schedule. 

|-
!colspan=12 style=| Regular Season

|-
!colspan=12 style=| Big 12 Tournament

|-
!colspan=12 style=| NCAA tournament

Rankings

*AP does not release post-NCAA Tournament rankings.^Coaches do not release a Week 1 poll.

References

Iowa State Cyclones men's basketball seasons
Iowa State
Iowa State